Sir Angus Duncan Aeneas Stirling (born 10 December 1933) is a former director general of the National Trust and has served on many other charitable bodies in the United Kingdom.

He was educated at Eton College and Trinity College, Cambridge, before taking a Diploma in the History of Art at London University as an extramural student.  Hon Fellow The Courtauld Institute of Art, and  Trinity Laban Conservatoire of Music and Dance.  He trained as an artist at the Lydgate Art Research Centre  in Britain and has had exhibitions in London and in Somerset.

Appointments
Director General of the National Trust 1983–95
Chairman of the Greenwich Foundation for the Royal Naval College, Greenwich 1997–2004
Trustee of The Samuel Courtauld Trust 1990–2012
Member of Governing Board, The Courtauld Institute of Art 1981–83 and 2002–14
Trustee, World Monuments Fund in Britain, 1996–2007
Governor of Gresham's School
Chairman of the Royal Opera House, 1991–1996
Trustee of the City and Guilds of London Art School
Chairman of the Joint Nature Conservation Committee 1997–2002
Member of the Stowe House Preservation Trust 1998–2012
President of the Friends of Holland Park

References

Knights Bachelor
1933 births
Living people
People educated at Eton College
Alumni of Trinity College, Cambridge